Pierre Feuga (16 October 1942 – 10 June 2008) was a French novelist, essayist and translator (from Sanskrit and Latin). A specialist of the Vedanta, the cults of Shakti and tantrism, he also taught yoga for twenty-seven years.

Biography 
Born in a family of artists and travelers, Pierre Feuga also made long trips around the world. He won the Concours général of literature at age sixteen while he was a pupil at Lycée Louis-le-Grand in Paris.

Although Feuga did not recognize any master, he nevertheless was very influenced by Patrick Le Bail then Jean Klein with whom he studied the Vedanta and the Hatha-Yoga in the tradition of Jammu-Kashmir.

After a long sailing trip that led him to New Caledonia (where he gave his first yoga classes), he settled in Paris and taught there until his death on 10 June 2008.

At the same time, he undertook a series of works on the Tantric universe as well as on awakening. Publishing in particular with Dangles and Albin Michel, he was entrusted in 1998 with the drafting of the Que sais-je? devoted to yoga (#643) in collaboration with Tara Michaël.

In 2004 he became the literary editor of the Almora editions.

He was also a member of the editorial board of the journal .

Publications 
1963: Cracher dans la mer, novel, Éditions Julliard
1965: La Galère en bois de rose, novel, Robert Laffont
1988: Cent douze méditations tantriques, the "Vijñâna-Bhairava", translation from Sanskrit and commentary, Accarias/L'Originel,  
1989: Cinq visages de la Déesse, Le Mail/Le Rocher,  
1989: Liber de Catulle, translation from Latin, Orphée/La Différence
1990: Les Trophées, José-Maria de Heredia, choice and presentation, Orphée/La Différence
1990: Le bonheur est de ce monde, Accarias-L'Originel, 
1992: Satires de Juvénal, translation from Latin, Orphée/La Différence
1992: L'Art de la concentration, Albin Michel, series "Espaces libres", n°32, 
1994: Tantrisme, Dangles, 
1998: Le Yoga, in collaboration with Tara Michaël, PUF, series Que sais-je ?, n°643
2004: Comme un cercle de feu, translation from Sanskrit and commentaries of the Mândûkya-upanishad and the Kârikâ by Gaudapâda, Accarias-L'Originel, 
2005: Pour l'Éveil, Almora, 
2008: Le Chemin des flammes, Almora, 
2008: Le Miroir du vent, novel, Almora,  
2010: Fragments tantriques, Almora, (posthumous collection of articles and chronicles),

References

External links 
 Pierre Feuga's website
 Pierre Feuga on Babelio
 Dormir dans les postures ? par Pierre Feuga
 Interview with Pierre Feuga (9 October 2012)

Lycée Louis-le-Grand alumni
20th-century French writers
21st-century French writers
20th-century French essayists
21st-century French essayists
French Indologists
Translators from Sanskrit
Translators to French
Prix Fénéon winners
People from Gers
1942 births
2008 deaths
20th-century translators